Captain Blood may refer to:

 Captain Blood (novel), by Rafael Sabatini
 Captain Blood (1924 film), based on the Sabatini novel
 Captain Blood (1935 film), based on the Sabatini novel

  ‘’Captain Blood (1937, Feb 22 Lux Radio Theatre), based on the Sabatini novel 
 Fortunes of Captain Blood, a 1950 film based on the Sabatini novel
 Age of Pirates: Captain Blood, 2011 action-adventure game based on Sabatini's novel
 Captain Blood (1960 film), a French-Italian film based on a novel by a different author
 Captain Blood (video game), 1988, unrelated to the Sabatini novel
 Jack Dyer (1913–2003), Australian rules footballer nicknamed Captain Blood

See also 
 Thomas Blood, known as Colonel Blood, who tried to steal Britain's Crown Jewels during the reign of Charles II of England